Matthew Colin "Col" Donohoe (1929-1986) was an Australian professional rugby league footballer for the Eastern Suburbs and South Sydney clubs, playing between 1951 and 1959.

Club career

Col Donohoe, a half-back, played 4 seasons with the Sydney Roosters in 1949, 1951,1952 and 1953. Donohoe then played 5 seasons at South Sydney Rabbitohs between 1955 and 1959. He is remembered by South's fans as the man who scored  a try late in the grand final that won South Sydney Rabbitohs the 1955 Premiership.

Representative career

Col Donohoe represented NSW Country Firsts on one occasion in 1950. He then represented New South Wales on three occasions in the years 1954 and 1956.

He also played half-back for the Kangaroos, in the Third Test against New Zealand  representing Australia for the first time on 2 July 1952. Donohue is listed on the Australian Players Register as Kangaroo No.294.

Col Donohoe died in 1986 following complications during an operation for a hip replacement 47 days short of his 57th birthday.

References

1929 births
1986 deaths
Australia national rugby league team players
Australian rugby league players
Country New South Wales rugby league team players
New South Wales rugby league team players
Rugby league halfbacks
Rugby league players from Sydney
South Sydney Rabbitohs players
Sydney Roosters coaches
Sydney Roosters players